Laurent Porchier (born 27 June 1968) is a French competition rower and Olympic champion.

Porchier won a gold medal in the lightweight coxless four at the 2000 Summer Olympics.

References

1968 births
French male rowers
Olympic rowers of France
Rowers at the 2000 Summer Olympics
Olympic gold medalists for France
Living people
Olympic medalists in rowing
Medalists at the 2000 Summer Olympics
World Rowing Championships medalists for France
20th-century French people